Kottuvally is a census town in Paravoor.It is also a village in  Paravur Taluk, Ernakulam district in the Indian state of Kerala. The village is situated in the south of the taluk. 
The nearest town is North Paravur, 4 km away. The Kottuvally panchayath is spread out on both sides of NH-66 road.

History
Kottuvally is one of the early nine panchayats formed in Travancore. It is notable as many social activists lived here. These activists fought against untouchability and other practises. They also initiated strikes in agricultural fields for more payments, etc. Thattapilly -  Cheriyapilly - Ernakulam boat service is now history. In 1962, the Cheriyapilly bridge opened.

Life
The people here depend on fishing, pokkali cultivation, other jobs

Demographics 
 India census, Kottuvally had a population of 37,884. Males constitute 49% of the population and females 51%.  Kottuvally has an average literacy rate of 84%, higher than the national average of 59.5%: male literacy is 86%, and female literacy is 83%.  In Kottuvally, 10% of the population is under 6 years of age.

Religious
Masjids
Vaniyakkad Juma Masjid
Kaitharam juma masjid
Valluvally juma masjid
Cheriyappilly juma masjid
Kattenellure Munavarsha Thangal Masjid Tattappilly

Temples
 Kottuvallykkav temple
 Mannam Subramanya temple
 Thrikkapuram Bhagavathy temple 
 Kottuvally Sreenarayana temple ( https://web.archive.org/web/20160127201113/http://www.kottuvallysreenarayanatemple.com/ )
 Pazhangat Sree Kaleeswari temple
 Kandakarnan temple

Churches
 Koonamav St.Philomanas Church where the tomb of Father Chavara is kept
 St.Sebastians church kottuvally
 St. Antony Church, Cheriyapilly
 St. Antony Church, Kochal, Valluvally

Educational institutions
 St. Philomanas HSS
 Kuriakose Chavara memorial Private ITI
 Chavara Darsan CMI Public School
 Kaitharam Govt. HSS
 Govt. UPS, Schoolpaddy, Valluvally.
 Thattapilly UP School
 Kottuvally UP School
 St.Louis LP School
 St.Josephs UP School, Koonamav

Health
 Govt. Hospital, Koonamav
 Little Flower Hospital

Localities
Vaniyakkad, Kaitharam, Kizhkkepram, Kuttanthuruth, Mannam, Thattapilly, Valluvally, Kochal, Koonamav, Kottuvallikav, Cheriyapilly,  Kottuvally, Thrikkapuram

See also
 Paravur Taluk
 Ernakulam district

References 

Cities and towns in Ernakulam district
Suburbs of Kochi